The Lomita Marl is a geologic formation in Los Angeles County, southern California.

It preserves Pleistocene fossils.

See also

 
 List of fossiliferous stratigraphic units in California
 Paleontology in California

References
 
 
 Natural History Museum of Los Angeles: The fossils of Los Angeles website

Geologic formations of California
Geology of Los Angeles County, California
Pleistocene California
Pleistocene Series of North America
Lomita, California